Xinying District or Sinying District is a district and the location of the second administrative center of the Tainan City Government in Taiwan. Sugar production was the most important industry in Xinying.

History

On 7 January 1946, Tainan County was established and Xinying Township was made its county capital. On 25 December 1981, Xinying was upgraded from an urban township to a county-administered city. After 25 December 2010, Tainan City merged with Tainan County to form a single special municipality, subsequently Xinying City became Xinying District and became the capital of Tainan City along with Anping District.

Geography
Located in the northern portion of Tainan, Xinying has a tropical monsoon climate and is known for its many snacks and traditions.

Administrative divisions

Government institutions

 Tainan City Government

Education

Senior high schools
 National Xinying Senior High School (國立新營高級中學)
 National Xinying Industrial Professional School (國立新營高級工業職業學校)
 Tainan City Nan'guang Private Senior High School (臺南市私立南光高級中學)
 Tainan City Xingguo Private Senior High School (臺南市私立興國高級中學)
 Tainan City Yude Private Industrial Professional School (臺南市私立育德工業家事職業學校)

Junior high schools
 Tainan City Xindong Junior High School (臺南市立新東國民中學)
 Tainan City Taizi Junior High School (Taizi Palace) (臺南市立太子國民中學【太子宮】)
 Tainan City Nanxin Junior High School (臺南市立南新國民中學)

Primary schools
 Tainan City Xinying District Primary School (臺南市新營區新營國民小學)
 Tainan City Xinying District Tuku Primary School (臺南市新營區土庫國民小學)
 Tainan City Xinying District Gongcheng Primary School (臺南市新營區公誠國民小學)
 Tainan City Xinying District Nanzi Primary School (臺南市新營區南梓國民小學)
 Tainan City Xinying District Xinsheng Primary School (臺南市新營區新生國民小學)
 Tainan City Xinying District Xintai Primary School (臺南市新營區新泰國民小學)
 Tainan City Xinying District Xinjin Primary School (臺南市新營區新進國民小學)
 Tainan City Xinying District Xinqiao Primary School (Tiexian Bridge) (臺南市新營區新橋國民小學【鐵線橋】)
 Tainan City Xinying District Xinxing Primary School (臺南市新營區新興國民小學)
 Tainan City Xinying District Xinmin Primary School (臺南市新營區新民國民小學)

Tourist attractions
 Nanying Green Heart Park
 Xinying Cultural Center
 Xinying Night Market
 Taiwan Sugar Corporation Xinying Factory
 Nanying Green Metropolitan Park (南瀛綠都心公園)
 Swan Lake Park (天鵝湖公園)
 Xinying Sugar Rail Bike Route (新營糖鐵自行車道)
 Changsheng Military Base Green Tunnel (長勝營區綠色隧道)
 Nanzhi Community Park
 New Art Park Camp

Transportation

Xinying is served by National Freeway 1 and the TRA Western Line (臺鐵西部幹線) Xinying Station. It is also served by Provincial Highway No. 1.

See also
 Tainan

References

External links

  

Districts of Tainan